Allowance may refer to:

 Allowance (engineering), a planned deviation between two dimensions
 Allowance (money), an amount of money given at regular intervals for a specific purpose
 Allowance for bad debts in accounting
 Carbon emission trading as an economic tool in climate change mitigation
 Emissions trading for pollutants in general

See also

 Welfare, a type of government support to ensure members of a society can meet basic human needs
 Allowance system, a 19th-century system of poor relief in Britain
 Allowance race, in North American horse racing
 Baggage allowance, the amount of baggage allowed per passenger
 EU Allowance in the European Union Emission Trading Scheme
 Personal allowance in the United Kingdom's taxing system
 Seam allowance in sewing